The following is a list of the 15 cantons of the Cantal department, in France, following the French canton reorganisation which came into effect in March 2015:

 Arpajon-sur-Cère
 Aurillac-1
 Aurillac-2
 Aurillac-3
 Mauriac
 Maurs
 Murat
 Naucelles
 Neuvéglise-sur-Truyère
 Riom-ès-Montagnes
 Saint-Flour-1
 Saint-Flour-2
 Saint-Paul-des-Landes
 Vic-sur-Cère
 Ydes

References